Cabwaylingo State Forest is a  state forest in Wayne County, West Virginia, United States. Cabwaylingo's dense forest was restored and its facilities constructed by the Civilian Conservation Corps (CCC) throughout the 1930s and 1940s. It takes its name from the four surrounding counties: Cabell, Wayne, Lincoln, and Mingo.

The forest contains a number of projects built by the Civilian Conservation Corps during the Great Depression, including 14 guest cabins, the park headquarters, and picnic shelters.  Another CCC project is the Tick Ridge Fire Tower, built in 1935, which stands as one of the few remaining fire towers in West Virginia although it is closed to the public.

References

External links 
 

West Virginia state forests
Protected areas of Wayne County, West Virginia
Civilian Conservation Corps in West Virginia
Campgrounds in West Virginia